Highway 5 or the Trans-Samaria Highway (Kvish Hotze Shomron), is one of Israel's main highways, connecting the Mediterranean coast immediately north of Tel Aviv with the central Sharon plain and eastwards to Ariel and other Israeli settlements in the northern West Bank.

The name Highway 5 is commonly used to describe the section of the highway running from the road's western end at the Glilot Interchange until where it until it reaches the main entrance of Ariel. In this capacity it intersects and creates a connection between four important arterial freeways in the northern Tel Aviv area: The Coastal Highway (Highway 2), the Ayalon Highway (Highway 20), Geha Highway (Highway 4) and the Cross-Israel Highway (Highway 6).

An alternate name for the entire highway is Kvish Hotze Shomron meaning the Cross-Samaria highway though often this name is used when referring specifically to the section of the road in the West Bank, i.e., past the Green Line, where it continues east towards the Jordan Valley in the West Bank. This section from the Green Line to its eastern end has also been dedicated as "Derekh Haim" (Haim's Road, but also "Way of Life") after the late Haim Landau, a former Israeli Minister of Transportation.

Highway 5 initially reached Rosh HaAyin located inside of the green line, and served mainly the densely populated Gush Dan metropolitan area. In the West Bank, the main road was still the old Road 505, which since the events of the Second Intifada in 2000 has been partially closed to Jewish transportation. In the beginning of the 1990s, with the growth of Ariel and the settlements around it, arose the need for a more modern and wider road, than the single-lane low-quality Road 505. Therefore, Highway 5 was extended some 20 km to the east of the Green Line, ending almost within sight of Ariel and serving the largest block of the Israeli settlements in the northern West Bank counting about 50,000 people, as well as the Barkan Industrial Park. At the time, this section of Highway 5 was one of the biggest infrastructure projects that Israel had undertaken in the West Bank. As of 2017 the road terminates at a roundabout at the Ariel junction where it merges into Road 505 which continues east past Ariel until Petza'el, which is located on Route 90, the north–south road parallel to the Israel-Jordan border in the Jordan Valley.

The western section of the highway consists of between 3 and 5 lanes in each direction, that reduce in number as the highway heads eastward. The westward section surrounding Gush Dan is as of 2017 one of the most congested in Israel.

Highway 531, is a freeway which parallels Highway 5 and runs approximately 5–6 km to the north, was opened in 2017, and also contains a rail system. A toll fast lane project is planned along Highway 5.

Interchanges and Junctions

References

Limited-access roads in Israel
Roads in Israel
Roads in Israeli-occupied territories